Emma Mary Follis (born 6 January 1992) is an English footballer who plays as a midfielder for Charlton Athletic in the FA Women's Championship. She has previously had spells at Birmingham City and Reading F.C., as well as loan spells in the US with Seattle Reign and Seattle Sounders Women. Follis has represented England at Under 19 and Under 23 level.

Follis attended the University of Birmingham and played for the varsity team before graduating in 2013.

References

External links
 Reading player profile 
 

Living people
1992 births
English women's footballers
Women's association football forwards
Women's Super League players
Reading F.C. Women players
Aston Villa W.F.C. players
Birmingham City W.F.C. players
Charlton Athletic W.F.C. players
Women's Championship (England) players